is an action and comedy Japanese TV series starring Masaya Oki which was originally broadcast on Nippon TV in 1979. The show won great popularity in its time. It is noted for the ad-libbing and jokes by the cast and staff.

Plot
Masato Asō was a detective of Nizuma police station but he was forced to resign. He sets up office in a building in Aoyama as a private detective. Asō solves various incidents taking advantage of his former profession. He is always trying to get a lot of money even with nearly illegal ways through works from clients. But eventually, it always ends up not working. Each of Asō private detective office's members has their own profession, but helps Aso's investigation as a part-time job. They have unique nicknames.

Cast

Asō's private detective office members 
 Masaya Oki as Masato Asō (Cap)
 Yumi Takigawa as Youko Fujinami (You), a secretary of Asō
 Kyōhei Shibata as Shōzō Irie (Darts)
 Masaki Kanda as Jun Serizawa (Jun)
 Atsushi Watanabe as Itaru Shimaoka (Navi)

Niizuma Police station detectives 
 Tōru Emori as Detective Nagumo, Asō's former boss
 Hiroshi Katsuno as Detective Katsura, Asō's former colleague and close friend
 Keiji Mikage as Detective Kanazawa, Asō's former colleague
 Yuji Yokotani as Detective Jimbo (Gorilla)

Others 
 Akira Onodera as Lawer Fujinami 
 Naomi Hase as Kumiko, a secretary of Fujinami
 Tappei Shimokawa as Harada
 Taisaku Akino as Suehiro Teppie

Staff
Producer: Hirokichi Okada
Music: SHOGUN
Action director: Kunishirō Hayashi (Hayashi appeared as an actor in episode 16.)

References

External links
 

Japanese drama television series
Nippon TV dramas
Detective television series
1979 Japanese television series debuts
Japanese detective television drama series